The Palästinalied ("Palestine Song") is a crusade song written in the early 13th century by Walther von der Vogelweide, the most celebrated lyric poet of Middle High German literature. It is one of the few songs by Walther for which a melody has survived.

The melody has been suggested to be a contrafactum of 12th-century troubadour Jaufre Rudel's song "Lanquan li jorn".

The Palästinalied was written at the time of the Fifth Crusade (1217–1221). 
Its oldest attestation is in the Kleine Heidelberger Liederhandschrift (ms. A, ca. 1270), in seven stanzas. 
The oldest source for the melody is the so-called Münster fragment (ms. Z, 14th century).

The subject of the song is the Christian gospel told from the perspective of a pilgrim setting foot in the Holy Land. 
The song's conclusion refers to the crusades themselves, asserting that, in view of the claim of Christians, Jews and "heathens" (Muslims) to the Holy Land, the Christian claim is the just one (  "All the world is warring here [in the Holy Land] / Our claim is the just one / It is right that He [God] grant it").

Text
The Kleine Heidelberger Liederhandschrift (ms. A) is the oldest source of the text (dated to the 1270s), giving seven stanzas. The Codex Manesse  (ms. C, fol 126rv, dated c. 1304)  has nine stanzas.
Other manuscripts contribute an additional four, for a total of thirteen distinct stanzas. 
Of these, one (recorded as 4th stanza in ms. Z) is clearly younger than the original composition. On the remaining five stanzas not in ms. A, there is no expert consensus as to whether they should be regarded as Walter's.

The nine stanzas in C are numbered C21–C29, the seven stanzas in A are A50–A56.
Three stanzas are identical between A and C (C22=A51, C23=A52, C29=A56) and another have only minor differences, such as transposed word order (C21=A50, C25–27 = A53–55). The fourth and eighth stanzas in C (C24, C28) are not recorded in A.

Melody
The earliest source for the melody is  the Münster fragment (ms. Z), written about a century after Walther's death.
The Carmina Burana ms. (c. 1230) contains the first stanza of Palästinalied  (CB 211a)  with neumes, which are however insufficient for reconstructing a melody. The stanza is given as an appendix to  Alte clamat Epicurus (CB 211), which was to be sung in the same melody.

Modern reception
With the increased popularity of Medieval rock, Neofolk and related musical styles in the late 1980s and 1990s, the Palästinalied became a sort of staple song for such genres and is now well known to modern audiences due to performances by mainly German bands, including (among others):
Ougenweide (album All die Weil Ich Mag, 1974)
Corvus Corax (album Congregatio, 1991)
Radio Tarifa (album Rumba Argelina, 1993)
Qntal (album Qntal II, 1995)
Estampie (album Crusaders, 1996)
In Extremo (album Weckt die Toten!, 1998)
Djembe (album Хиты Средневековья, 1999)
Mediaeval Baebes (album Undrentide, 2000)
Finisterra (album Kein Evoë – Kein Requiem, 2002)
Unto Ashes (EP I Cover You With Blood, 2003)
Heimataerde (instrumental), album Gotteskrieger (2005)
Eisenfunk (Dance/electronic), album Schmerzfrequenz (2005)
Omnia (in "Teutates," album PaganFolk, 2006)
Luc Arbogast (album Hortus Dei, 2006)
In Extremo (album Quid Pro Quo, 2016)
Jaramar (album Lenguas, 1998)
Palästinalied-Projekt is a compilation of 20 performances of the song (2002).

The Austrian Ensemble for Early Music Dulamans Vröudenton recorded a reconstructionist performance of "Palästinalied".

Lou Harrison's String Quartet Set's 1st movement takes much of its melody from this song.

See also
 Unter der Linden
 Elegie
 Medieval German literature
 Lyric poetry

References

Karl Lachmann (ed.), Die Gedichte Walthers von der Vogelweide (1843), 14–16 (14th ed.  Christoph Cormeau,  1996).
Franz Pfeiffer, Deutsche Classiker des Mittelalters (1864), 151–158.
 Wilhelm Wilmanns. Walther von der Vogelweide (1886), 92–94.
 Meinolf Schumacher: "Die Konstituierung des „Heiligen Landes“ durch die Literatur. Walthers „Palästinalied“ und die Funktion der europäischen Kreuzzugsdichtung." In Orientdiskurse in der deutschen Literatur, edited by Klaus Michael Bogdal, Bielefeld: Aisthesis Verlag, 2007, pp. 11–30  PDF

Works by Walther von der Vogelweide
Christian songs
13th-century songs
1220s works
Medieval compositions
Works about Palestine (region)
Fifth Crusade